Hazora is a village in Tajikistan. It is part of the jamoat Zideh in Varzob District, one of the Districts of Republican Subordination.

References

Populated places in Districts of Republican Subordination